The Innovation and Unity Party—Social Democracy (PINU-SD) is a social democratic political party in Honduras, established in 1970. PINU was created by Miguel Andonie Fernández as a democratic, moderate left-wing alternative to the two major parties and the military regime.

2001 elections
At Congressional elections held 25 November 2001, PINU won 4 seats in the 128-member assembly. In the presidential contest the same day, Olban Valladares placed third in a five-man field, taking about 1.5% of the vote. This was Valladares' third attempt at the presidency, after participating in the 1993 and 1997 elections.

2005 elections
In the legislative elections of 27 November 2005, the party won 2 out of 128 seats in the Congress. Its candidate at the presidential elections, Carlos Sosa Coello won 1.0%.

2009 elections
PINU's candidate in the 2009 presidential election was Bernard Martínez Valerio.

See also
Politics of Honduras

References

External links
Official website

1970 establishments in Honduras
Organizations based in Tegucigalpa
Political parties established in 1970
Political parties in Honduras
Social democratic parties